Pyrularia edulis is a species of shrub or small tree in the sandalwood family. It grows in Bhutan, China, India, Myanmar, and Nepal.

References

Santalaceae